The 2016 NCAA Men's National Collegiate Volleyball Tournament was the 47th annual tournament to determine the national champion of NCAA Division I and Division II men's collegiate indoor volleyball. The single elimination tournament was played at Rec Hall in University Park, Pennsylvania from May 3–7, 2016.

Qualification
With the creation of the separate NCAA Men's Division III Volleyball Championship in 2012, combined with the completion of the transition of the last Division III institution competing at the National Collegiate level, Rutgers–Newark, to Division III volleyball after the 2014 season, only NCAA men's volleyball programs from Division I and Division II were eligible for this tournament.

For the third straight year, a total of 6 teams were invited:
 Champions of the following conferences:
 Conference Carolinas
 Eastern Intercollegiate Volleyball Association
 Midwestern Intercollegiate Volleyball Association
 Mountain Pacific Sports Federation
 Two at-large teams

Tournament bracket 
The six teams were seeded according to the same methods used to seed the teams in previous tournaments; the top two seeds received byes into the Final Four, while the third seed faced the sixth seed in the quarterfinals, and likewise the fourth seed faced the fifth seed.
Two quarterfinal "play-in" matches of the 2016 tournament were held at the Rec Hall on the campus of Penn State University on May 3.  (#3 vs. #6 seed; #4 vs. #5 seed)
The semifinals were held in the Rec Hall on May 5. (#1 vs. #4-#5 winner; #2 vs. #3-#6 winner)
The 2016 NCAA Championship match was held in the Rec Hall on May 7

All-Tournament Team 
Jake Arnitz – UCLA
T.J DeFalco – Long Beach State
Miles Johnson – Ohio State (Most Outstanding Player)
Jake Langlois – BYU
Blake Leeson – Ohio State
Brendan Sander – BYU
Nicolas Szerszen – Ohio State

Broadcasts  
Penn State's website carried the first round matches with video and no commentary. NCAA.com carried both national semifinals. ESPN2 carried the national championship. BYU Radio provided national radio coverage of one semifinal and the national championship.

TV/Streaming
Semifinals: Ralph Bednarcyzk
Championship: Paul Sunderland & Kevin Barnett

Radio
Jarom Jordan & Rob Neilson (BYU Radio)

See also 
 NCAA Men's Volleyball Championships (Divisions I & II, Division III)
 NCAA Women's Volleyball Championships (Division I, Division II, Division III)

References

2016
NCAA Men's Volleyball Championship
NCAA Men's Volleyball Championship
2016 in sports in Pennsylvania
2016 NCAA Division I & II men's volleyball season
May 2016 sports events in the United States
Volleyball in Pennsylvania